Doltcini–Van Eyck–Proximus is a Belgian UCI Women's Continental Team formed in 2016, which competes in elite women's road bicycle racing events, such as the UCI Women's World Tour.

Team roster

Major wins
2016
Mountains classification  Tour de Feminin-O cenu Českého Švýcarska, Flávia Oliveira
2017
Zonnebeke – Cyclo-cross, Thalita de Jong
2018
Ooike (Ladies Cycling Trophy Oost-Vlaanderen), Sofie De Vuyst
Wortegem-Petegem (Ladies Cycling Trophy Oost-Vlaanderen), Lotte Van Hoek
Stage 3 Tour of Zhoushan Island, Kelly Druyts
 Mountains classification Panorama Guizhou International Women's Road Cycling Race, Tetyana Ryabchenko
Stage 3, Kelly Druyts
Mol-Sluis, Kelly Druyts
Kontich, Demmy Druyts
Stage 5 Tour de Feminin-O cenu Českého Švýcarska, Sofie De Vuyst
2020
Stage 4 Dubai Tour, Nicole Steigenga
2021
Gullegem Cyclo-cross, Blanka Vas
 Antwerpen Provincial Time Trial Championship, Amber Aernouts
Landen Road Race, Fien Van Eynde

National champions

2017
 Portugal Track (Individual Pursuit), Daniela Reis
 Portugal Track (Points race), Daniela Reis

2018
 Portugal Time Trial, Daniela Reis
 Portugal Road Race, Daniela Reis
 France Track (Points Race), Pascale Jeuland

2019
 France Time Trial, Séverine Eraud
 Portugal Time Trial, Daniela Reis

2020
 Hungary Cyclo-cross, Kata Blanka Vas
 Hungary Road Race, Kata Blanka Vas
 Austria Road Race, Kathrin Schweinberger
 Cyprus Road Race, Antri Christoforou
 Cyprus Time Trial, Antri Christoforou
 Austria Track (Omnium), Kathrin Schweinberger

2021
 Hungary Cyclo-cross, Kata Blanka Vas
 Austria Road Race, Kathrin Schweinberger

Development team

 also operates a developmental team which serves as a training base and foundation for younger riders aiming to make it into the professional ranks.

Team roster

Major wins
2017
Montenaken Chrono, Febe Schokkaert
 Provincial Time Trial Championship Oost-Vlaanderen, Febe Schokkaert
 Provincial Time Trial Championship West-Vlaanderen, Shari Bossuyt
 Provincial Junior Road Race Championship Vlaams-Brabant, Ditte Lenseclaes

National champions
2017
 Belgium Junior Track (Omnium), Shari Bossuyt 
 Belgium Junior Time Trial, Shari Bossuyt

References

External links

UCI Women's Teams
Cycling teams established in 2016
Cycling teams based in Belgium